The Employment Act 1980 (c 42) is an Act of the Parliament of the United Kingdom, passed under the first term of Margaret Thatcher's premiership and mainly relating to trade unions.

Overview

It restricted the definition of lawful picketing 'strictly to those who were themselves party to the dispute and who were picketing at the premises of their own employer'.

It also introduced ballots on the existence of closed shops, and at least 80% of the workers in a particular industry need to support them for their maintenance.

See also
UK labour law

Notes

References
B A Hepple, Paul O'Higgins and Lord Wedderburn of Charlton. Sweet & Maxwell's Labour Relations Statutes and Materials. Second Edition. Sweet & Maxwell. London. 1983. . pp 446–457.

United Kingdom Acts of Parliament 1980
United Kingdom labour law
Trade union legislation
1980 in labor relations